Mahewish Shahid Khan (born 12 August 1981) is a Pakistani-Canadian former cricketer who played as a right-arm medium-fast bowler and right-handed batter. She appeared in two Test matches and 14 One Day Internationals for Pakistan between 1998 and 2001 before moving to play for Canada, appearing in 3 Twenty20 Internationals for the side in 2019.

In May 2019, she was named as the captain of Canada's squad for the 2019 ICC Women's Qualifier Americas tournament against the United States. She made her WT20I debut for Canada against the United States in the Americas Qualifier on 17 May 2019.

References

External links
 
 

1981 births
Living people
Cricketers from Karachi
Pakistani women cricketers
Canadian women cricketers
Pakistan women Test cricketers
Pakistan women One Day International cricketers
Canada women Twenty20 International cricketers
Dual international cricketers
Pakistani emigrants to Canada
Naturalized citizens of Canada
Women cricket captains